Ionia was an ancient region of southwestern coastal Anatolia (in present-day Turkey).

Ionia may also refer to:

Places

Greece
 Ionian Islands
 Ionia, Chios

United States
 Ionia, Iowa
 Ionia Township, Jewell County, Kansas
 Ionia, Kansas
 Ionia County, Michigan
 Ionia, Michigan
 Ionia Township, Michigan
 Ionia, Missouri
 Ionia, Nebraska
 Ionia, New York (disambiguation), multiple locations
 Ionia (Trevilians, Virginia), a historic plantation house
 Ionia Volcano, east of Newcastle, Nebraska, U.S.

Other places
 Ionia (satrapy), in the First Persian Empire

Fictional locations
 Ionia, a fictional place in the video game League of Legends

People and characters
 Ionia, stage name for Clémentine de Vère (1888–1973), magician and illusionist
 Ionia, a fictional character in the video game Mother 3

Other uses 
 Ionia (album), by Lycia, 1991
 Ionia (novel), by Alexander Craig, 1898

See also 

Ionic (disambiguation), including "Ionian"